The Rosh HaNikra Islands (Iye Rosh Hanikra) are a group of three Israeli islands in the Mediterranean Sea, named Shahaf, Nahalieli and T'chelet. The islands are located approximately 800 meters offshore, near Rosh HaNikra. These islands are a single geological unit with the Achziv Islands, that are further south. 
The depth of the sea water around them is approximately between 7 and 9 meters. The Rosh HaNikra Islands are characterized by many natural pools that provide a natural habitat for various life forms.

The Rosh HaNikra Islands are a part of a natural reserve, and boarding these islands is prohibited. These islands are the only place in Israel where certain rare birds nest: the white wagtail, the European herring gull and the common tern. The waters surrounding these islands contain a rich variety of marine life.

In ancient days, these islands had a certain economic and commercial significance as they were a natural habitat for the sea snail from which Tyrian purple dye was produced.

References 
 Article

Islands of Israel
Nature reserves in Israel